Cottage Grove is a city  south of Saint Paul in Washington County in the State of Minnesota. It lies on the north bank of the Mississippi River, north of the confluence with the St. Croix River. Cottage Grove and nearby suburbs form the southeast portion of Minneapolis-Saint Paul, the 16th-largest metropolitan area in the United States, with about 3.69 million residents. Its population was 38,839 at the 2020 census.

The city is linked by U.S. Highways 10 and 61 and has a comfortable commute to both downtowns and the I-494 Strip in Bloomington. Once a rural township known for the state's first creameries and wheat production, the area was served by rail lines, river shipping, and grist mills. 3M has operated a production facility in Cottage Grove since 1947.

History
Cottage Grove was platted in 1871.  The Precolumbian Schilling Archeological District, 1850 Grey Cloud Lime Kiln, 1871 John P. Furber House, and 1917 Cordenio Severance House are listed on the National Register of Historic Places.

Geography
Cottage Grove is 11 miles southeast of St. Paul. It is accessed by U.S. Highway 61 and Interstate 494.

The city has more land adjacent to the Mississippi River than any other city in Minnesota. It is bordered by Woodbury to the north, Hastings to the south, St. Paul Park to the west, Newport to the northwest, and Denmark Township to the east. The city is approximately half an hour at posted speeds from the Minneapolis-St. Paul International Airport. Southeastern Cottage Grove is five miles from the Wisconsin border.

Demographics

The median income for a household in the city was $65,825, and the median income for a family was $68,935 (these figures had risen to $79,342 and $84,185 respectively as of a 2007 estimate). Males had a median income of $45,567 versus $31,232 for females. The per capita income for the city was $23,348.  About 1.8% of families and 2.2% of the population were below the poverty line, including 3.5% of those under age 18 and 2.6% of those age 65 or over.

2010 census
As of the census of 2010, there were 34,589 people, 11,719 households, and 9,437 families living in the city. The racial makeup of the city was 86.5% White, 3.9% African American, 0.5% Native American, 5.3% Asian, 0.1% Pacific Islander, 1.4% from other races, and 2.3% from two or more races. Hispanic or Latino of any race were 4.8% of the population.

There were 11,719 households, of which 43.7% had children under the age of 18 living with them, 66.6% were married couples living together, 9.3% had a female householder with no husband present, 4.6% had a male householder with no wife present, and 19.5% were non-families. 14.9% of all households were made up of individuals, and 5.3% had someone living alone who was 65 years of age or older. The average household size was 2.95 and the average family size was 3.27.

The median age in the city was 35 years. 29% of residents were under the age of 18; 7.8% were between the ages of 18 and 24; 29% were from 25 to 44; 25.9% were from 45 to 64; and 8.3% were 65 years of age or older. The gender makeup of the city was 49.9% male and 50.1% female.

2000 census
As of the census of 2000, there were 30,582 people, 9,932 households, and 8,462 families living in the city. The racial makeup of the city was 93.54% White, 2.35% African American, 0.41% Native American, 1.43% Asian, 0.06% Pacific Islander, 0.91% from other races, and 1.30% from two or more races. Hispanic or Latino of any race were 2.53% of the population.

There were 9,932 households, out of which 49.8% had children under the age of 18 living with them, 72.9% were married couples living together, 8.8% had a female householder with no husband present, and 14.8% were non-families. 11.0% of all households were made up of individuals, and 2.7% had someone living alone who was 65 years of age or older.  The average household size was 3.07 and the average family size was 3.32.

In the city, the population was spread out, with 32.7% under the age of 18, 7.4% from 18 to 24, 34.4% from 25 to 44, 20.7% from 45 to 64, and 4.9% who were 65 years of age or older.  The median age was 32 years. For every 100 females, there were 99.3 males.  For every 100 females age 18 and over, there were 98.0 males.

Economy
3M has operated a production facility in Cottage Grove since 1947 to manufacture adhesive products, industrial polymers, and reflective road sign materials, and for research and development. PFC production began as a pilot around 1947; full-scale commercial PFOA production began in 1976 and was phased out in 2002. The site is part of the Minnesota Pollution Control Agency Superfund program for perfluorochemical contamination.

Arts and culture

Annual cultural events
Cottage Grove's annual Strawberry Fest draws thousands of residents together to celebrate. This event is held at Kingston Park, usually in the second week of June. A parade occurs the Saturday of the festival, in which organizations or businesses can have a float, throw out candy, and advertise. On the Saturday of the festival, usually after the parade, organizations and businesses advertise in booths at the soccer fields at Kingston Park. They hand out free things and talk to the residents of Cottage Grove about their businesses. There are fireworks on the Saturday of the festival around 10 pm. There are many carnival games, rides, and food. Every night of the festival except Sunday, bands play in the Kingston parking lot. Alcohol is allowed but only in a designated area.

Museums and other points of interest
Historic places include Cedarhurst Mansion, Schilling Archeological District, Atkinson Cemetery, Cottage Grove Town Hall, Old People's Home of the Northwest Cemetery, Grey Cloud Lime Kiln, John P. Furber House, Dr. Arthur H. Steen House, First Congregational Church (Accacia Lodge No. 51), William W. Furber House, Cottage Grove Cemetery, Harry Roberts House, Lamar Avenue Larch Trees, and Hope Glen Farm.

Cottage Grove is home to Ravine Regional Park, with the entrance off of Keats Ave S. It is open daily from 6 A.M. to 10 P.M. The park has 515 acres of woods, hills, and prairie fields, creating a unique habitat for an assortment of species. A vehicle permit is required to enter the park grounds.

In 2013, Cottage Grove opened a splash pad at Highland Park off of 70th street. This is a smaller water attraction intended for small children. It has many sprinklers that shoot water. Several other splash pads in the Cottage Grove area are expected to open at other parks.

Cottage Grove has an 18-hole disc golf course in Oak Wood park, near its retail area. The course has a variety of different length holes and women's tees.

Cottage Grove had one of the two remaining drive-in theaters in operation in the Twin Cities area, the Cottage View Drive-In. It was near the Innovation Road exit of Highway 61. It closed after the 2012 season and was torn down. The land is now occupied by a Wal-Mart that opened in 2014.

Government
Cottage Grove is in Minnesota's 2nd congressional district, represented by Angie Craig. Its public buildings include City Hall, a three-sheet ice arena, four fire stations, a public works building and an 18-hole championship golf course, River Oaks. Washington County also has two buildings in town, the library and the South Washington County Service Center.

Education
Cottage Grove is part of the South Washington County School District. High School students living in Cottage Grove usually attend either Park High School or East Ridge High School. Cottage Grove also has the school district's Alternative Learning Center (ALC). Middle School students living in Cottage Grove usually attend either Cottage Grove Middle School or Oltman Middle School. Elementary School students usually attend one of the six elementary schools in the city: Armstrong Elementary, Cottage Grove Elementary, Crestview Elementary, Grey Cloud Elementary, Hillside Elementary, and Pine Hill Elementary.

Infrastructure

Transportation
Mainlines to Chicago of both the Canadian Pacific Railway and BNSF pass through Cottage Grove between US 61 and the Mississippi River.

Notable people

 Seth Appert, men's varsity ice hockey coach at Rensselaer Polytecnic Institute
 Michael Birawer, artist
 Mark Doten, novelist and librettist 
 Aurilla Furber, poet
 Joseph W. Furber, Minnesota legislator
 Walter R. Hanson, Minnesota state legislator
 Sam Jacobson, former NBA player; born in Cottage Grove
 Kerry Ligtenberg, former MLB pitcher; attended high school in Cottage Grove
 Manila Luzon, entertainer and runner-up on the third season of RuPaul's Drag Race
 Sean O'Connell, retired professional mixed martial artist
 Seann William Scott, actor

References

External links
 

History of Cottage Grove, MN—by Nancy Eike—from Washington County Historical Society

Cities in Minnesota
Cities in Washington County, Minnesota
Minnesota populated places on the Mississippi River
Populated places established in 1963
1963 establishments in Minnesota